Buumba Gabriel Halwand (born 23 September 1947) is a Zambian long-distance runner. He competed in the marathon at the 1980 Summer Olympics.

References

External links
 

1947 births
Living people
Athletes (track and field) at the 1980 Summer Olympics
Zambian male long-distance runners
Zambian male marathon runners
Olympic athletes of Zambia
Place of birth missing (living people)